Stemmatophora is a genus of snout moths described by Achille Guenée in 1854.

Species
 Stemmatophora albifimbrialis (Hampson, 1906)
 Stemmatophora austautalis (Oberthür, 1881)
 Stemmatophora bicincta de Joannis, 1927
 Stemmatophora borgialis (Duponchel, 1832)
 Stemmatophora brunnealis (Treitschke, 1829)
 Stemmatophora byzacaenicalis Ragonot, 1887
 Stemmatophora combustalis (Fischer von Röslerstamm, [1842])
 Stemmatophora gadesialis (Ragonot, 1882)
 Stemmatophora gredalis Zerny, 1935
 Stemmatophora honestalis (Treitschke, 1829)
 Stemmatophora incalidalis (Hübner, 1825)
 Stemmatophora malgassalis (Saalmüller, 1880)
 Stemmatophora matilei (Leraut, 2000)
 Stemmatophora orbicentralis (Rebel, 1902)
 Stemmatophora perrubralis (Hampson, 1917)
 Stemmatophora persica Amsel, 1949
 Stemmatophora robustus (Asselbergs, 2010}
 Stemmatophora rungsi (Leraut, 2000)
 Stemmatophora serratalis (Hampson, 1900)
 Stemmatophora syriacalis (Ragonot, 1895)
 Stemmatophora valida (Butler, 1879)
 Stemmatophora vulpecalis Ragonot, 1891

References

Pyralini
Pyralidae genera
Taxa named by Achille Guenée